Wael Muhammad Saleh Qasim Raddad (Arabic:وائل رداد) is a Jordanian novelist, painter and writer who was born in 1979 and raised in the United Arab Emirates, specifically in Ras al-Khaimah. He is of Palestinian origin. Raddad holds a BA in accounting from Al-Quds Open University. He is considered one of the most important writers in Jordan and Palestine in crime, horror, and science fiction literature. He published more than ten novels. His performance "Last Fall of the Angel" won a theatrical competition held in Sharjah, the Sharjah Theatrical Authoring Contest.

Education and career 
Raddad started writing novels in 2009. Most of his work revolves around the psychological, auditory and visual hallucinations that the characters represent in most of his novels. His novels are also marked by mystery and science fiction themes.

Published novels 
Raddad has published the following books:

  ('Clinical death'). Lebanon Dar Ikteb, 2009.
  ('Diary of the Drowned Rats'). Damascus: Dar Mamduh Eudwan, 2010.
  ('The symphony of the Valley of Shadows'). Egypt: Dar Sinbad Media and Publishing, 2010.
  ('The funeral of angels'). Saudi Arabia: Dar Rewayah, 2010.
  ('Elevator No. 7'). Egypt: Dar Sama for Publishing and Distribution, 2010.
  ('The Guardian Subordinate'). Egypt: Dar Sama for Publishing and Distribution, 2011.
  ('The Devil's Delegate'). Kuwait: Dar Platinum Book, 2011.
 . Kuwait: Dar Platinum Book, 2012.
  ('I Will Give You Sweets As Long As You Die'). Lebanon, All Prints Distributors & Publishers, 2013.
  ('The Dark Scenario: The Prince of Nightmares'). Egypt: Dar Sama for Distribution, and Publishing, 2013.
  ('Dark Scenario 2: The Secret Investigator'). Egypt: Dar Sama for Publishing, 2013.
  ('The Refuge'). Egypt, Dar Alrewaq for Publishing and Distribution, 2016
  ('My Best Devil'). Egypt, Dar Sama for Publishing and Distribution, 2016.
  ('The Naughty Club'). Egypt: Dar Ibiidi for Publishing, 2019.

Awards 

 He won the Sharjah Theatrical Days competition for theatrical composition for the performance "The Last Fall of the Angel".

References 

21st-century Jordanian writers
Jordanian novelists
21st-century Arabic writers
1972 births
Living people